Darwinilus sedarisi is a species of rove beetle, the only species in the genus Darwinilus. It is named after Charles Darwin and David Sedaris. It is found in Argentina.

Taxonomy
Darwinilus sedarisi was first described by the American entomologist Stylianos Chatzimanolis in 2014. It is known from only two specimens, both of which are males.

The second specimen was collected from Río Cuarto, Córdoba by a certain Breuer and deposited at the Museum für Naturkunde in Berlin, Germany. The exact date the specimen was collected is not known, but it is known to have happened before 1935 since the German entomologists Walther Horn and Ilse Kahle listed Breuer's collection in a 1935 paper.

Darwinilus sedarisi is the only species in the genus Darwinilus. It is classified under the subtribe Xanthopygina, tribe Staphylinini, subfamily Staphylininae of the rove beetle family Staphylinidae.

References

Beetles described in 2014
Fauna of Argentina
Staphylininae
Insects of South America